The Five Grains or Cereals are a grouping (or set of groupings) of five farmed crops that were all important in ancient China. Sometimes the crops themselves were regarded as sacred; other times, their cultivation was regarded as a sacred boon from a mythological or supernatural source. More generally, wǔgǔ can be employed in Chinese as a synecdoche referring to all grains or staple crops of which the end produce is of a granular nature. The identity of the five grains has varied over time, with different authors identifying different grains or even categories of grains.

Holiness
The sense of holiness or sacredness regarding the Five Grains proceeds from their traditional ascription to the saintly rulers credited with creating China's civilization. They were seen not merely as five crops chosen from many options but as the source permitting agrarian society and civilization itself. "Squandering the Five Grains" was seen as a sin worthy of torment in Diyu, the Chinese hell.

As the position of emperor was seen as an embodiment of this society, one's behavior towards the Five Grains could take on political meaning: as a protest against the overthrow of the Shang Dynasty by the Zhou, Boyi and Shuqi ostentatiously refused to eat the Five Grains. Such rejections of the grains for political reasons underwent a complex development into the concept of bigu, the esoteric Taoist practice of achieving immortality by avoiding certain foods.

Legendary accounts

By the time of written records, the development of agriculture in China had become greatly mythologized. There were various traditions regarding which of the early Chinese leaders introduced the Five Grains:

Shennong

Shennong (神農) (lit. "Divine Farmer") was a Chinese culture hero credited with the development of agriculture. He was often conflated with Yandi (the "Flaming Emperor") and is also sometimes described as the Wugu Xiandi or "Divine Emperor of the Five Grains". Sima Qian's chronology placed him around 2737–2699 BC.

In the Shennongjia ("Shennong's Ladder") area of Hubei, an oral epic poem titled the Hei'anzhuan ("Story of Chaos") describes Shennong finding the seeds of the Five Grains:
Shennong climbed onto Mount Yangtou,
He looked carefully, he examined carefully,
Then he found a seed of millet.
He left it with the Chinese date tree,
And he went to open up a wasteland.
He planted the seed eight times,
Then it produced fruit.
And from then on humans were able to eat millet.
He sought for the rice seed on Mount Daliang,
The seed was hiding in grasses.
He left it with the willow tree,
And he went to open up a paddy field.
He planted the seed seven times,
Then it produced fruit.
And from then on humans were able to eat rice.
He sought for the adzuki bean seed,
And left it with the plum tree.
He planted it one time.
The adzuki bean was so easy to plant and was able to grow in infertile fields.
The soybean was produced on Mount Weishi,
So it was difficult for Shennong to get its seeds.
He left one seed of it with a peach tree,
He planted it five times,
Then it produced fruit,
And later tofu was able to be made south of the Huai River.
Barley and wheat were produced on Mount Zhushi,
Shennong was pleased that he got two seeds of them.
He left them with a peach tree,
And he planted them twelve times,
Then later people were able to eat pastry food.
He sought the sesame seed on Mount Wuzhi,
He left the seed with brambles.
He planted it one time.
Then later people were able to fry dishes in sesame oil.
Shennong planted the five grains and they all survived,
Because they were helped by the six species of trees.

Huangdi

Huangdi (lit. "Yellow Emperor"), placed 2699–2588 BC by Sima Qian, was also credited in ancient texts as the first teacher of cultivation to his subjects.

Houji

Houji (lit. "Lord Millet") is sometimes credited with the original provision of millet from heaven to mankind and sometimes credited with its exemplary cultivation. Lord Millet was a title bestowed upon this figure by King Tang, founder of the Shang dynasty, and may have been an early position in the Chinese government. He was later worshipped as one of the patron gods of abundant harvests, like Lai Cho.

Archaeology

In northern China, the Nanzhuangtou culture on the middle Yellow River around Hebei (–7700 BC) had grinding tools. The Xinglongwa culture in eastern Inner Mongolia (–5400 BC) ate millet, possibly from agriculture. The Dadiwan culture along the upper Yellow River (–5400 BC) also ate millet. By the Yangshao culture (–3000 BC), the peoples of the Yellow River were growing millet extensively, along with some barley, rice, and vegetables; wove hemp and silk, which indicates some form of sericulture; but may have been limited to migratory slash and burn farming methods. The Longshan culture (–2000 BC) displays more advanced sericulture and definite cities.

In southern China, the Pengtoushan culture on the Yangtze River (–6100 BC) has left rice farming tools at some locations, though not at the type site. The Hemudu culture around Hangzhou Bay south of the Yangtze (–4500 BC) certainly cultivated rice. The various people (such as hundred viet tribal union) who succeeded in these areas were later conquered and culturally assimilated by the northern Chinese dynasties during the historical period.

Lists
There are various versions of which five crops (or even broad categories of crops) are meant by this list.

The Five Grains traditionally date back to the Shennong Ben Cao Jing, reputed to be a record of an oral tradition first delivered by Shennong himself. The Classic of Rites compiled by Confucius in the 6th and 5th centuries BC lists soybeans (菽), wheat (麥),  proso millet/broomcorn (黍), foxtail millet (稷) and rice (稻). Another version replaces rice with hemp (麻). The Hei'anzhuan cited above lists millet, rice, the adzuki bean, the soybean, barley and wheat together, and sesame as the "five" grains.

The Tang-era Buddhist master Daoxuan's Ritual of Measuring and Handling Light and Heavy Property (Liangchu Qingzhong Yi) instead lists five categories: "house" grain, "loose" grain, "horn" grain, "beard" grain, and "cart" grain. Huilin's Pronunciation and Meaning of All Scriptures (Yiqiejing Yinyi (Huilin)) cites Yang Chengtian's Assembly of Characters (Zitong) as describing similar categories: suigu, sangu, jiaogu, qigu, and shugu.

One modern Chinese dictionary notes other candidates including sesame, barley, oats, and peas.

Modern ritual and culinary usage 
Assortments of five grains continue to be used in ritual contexts, as in the Southern Min custom of creating a Taoist stove to cook Chui Zhao Fan, a meal for the Kitchen God in which five dry seeds are placed into a slot in the chimney of the stove. Casual worshippers may simply use any five beans (e.g., of different colors) instead of any particular set of grains.

Chinese cuisine is not known for any single recipe using all five grains, so there is no grain equivalent of five-spice powder or "eight treasure rice" (八寶飯, babaofan). Many, perhaps most, Chinese cooking employs the grains in some fashion, though: rice, congee, noodles, spring rolls, breads, tofu, wontons and other dumplings as dishes; sweet bean paste as fillings; glutinous rice as a wrapping, for example in zongzis; rice and soy milks and beverages; soy sauces and sesame oils; and fermentation starters for use in beers, rice wines, and native liquors like baijiu.

Gallery
Some of the characteristics of the concept of wugu are granularity and diversity, as the images below may help to show:

See also

 Agriculture in China
 Agriculture in Chinese mythology
 Baijiu liquor, whose varieties include Five Grains Liquid (Wuliangye, 五 粮 液)
 Bigu (avoiding grains), a traditional Daoist dietary practice
 Chinese cuisine
 Five Grains Garden in Manyo Botanical Garden, Nara, Japan
 History of agriculture#Ancient China
 History of Chinese cuisine
 Kasama Inari Shrine dedicated to Ukanomitama no kami, a spirit with jurisdiction over the five grains and foodstuffs
 Korean cuisine (section Grains), in whose myths deities brought seeds of five grains
 List of Five grains in world culture
 Ogokbap, five-grains rice in Korean cuisine
 Pha Trelgen Changchup Sempa, Tibetan cultural hero story involving 5 grains
 Qi Min Yao Shu, ancient Chinese agricultural text
 Sheji, soil and grain concept in East Asia
 Song Yingxing (section on Agriculture), encyclopedist, 1587–1666 CE, who offers a late period list of Wǔgǔ
 Wuliangye, example of distillation applied to grains
 Yin Hong, a character in the novel Fengshen Yanyi who is described as a Zhou prince later deified as the Five Grains Star (五谷星)
 Xian (Taoism) (section on Zhuangzi) where some shenren (神人 "divine person") do not eat (Wǔgǔ)

Notes

References
 Alan Davidson, Tom Jaine, The Oxford companion to food, p. 305, article on "five grains of China"
Yang, Lihui, et al. (2005). Handbook of Chinese Mythology. New York: Oxford University Press. 

Agriculture in China